Val Buëch-Méouge is a commune in the Hautes-Alpes department of southeastern France. The municipality was established on 1 January 2016 and consists of the former communes of Ribiers, Châteauneuf-de-Chabre and Antonaves.

Geography

Climate
Val Buëch-Méouge has a warm-summer mediterranean climate (Köppen climate classification Csb).

References

See also 
Communes of the Hautes-Alpes department

Valbuechmeouge
Communes nouvelles of Hautes-Alpes
Populated places established in 2016

2016 establishments in France